Cuttack Municipal Corporation is the municipal corporation governing the Indian city of Cuttack, which was earlier established as a municipality on 4 June 1876. The municipal corporation mechanism in India was introduced during British Rule with the formation of a municipal corporation in Madras (Chennai) in 1688, later followed by municipal corporations in Bombay (Mumbai) and Calcutta (Kolkata) by 1762. Cuttack Municipal Corporation is headed by the mayor of the city and governed by the commissioner. Cuttack is one of the oldest and major cities in India and the former capital of the state of Odisha.  It was named a corporation on 15 August 1994. The corporation covers an area of 192.5 km2 with a population above 14,54,328 (metro area). It includes road coverage of 783 km. with numerous drains of about 1729 km. It has set up 1,682 tube wells, 9,902 street lights, twelve medical dispensaries, one medical college cum hospital (largest in eastern India) and forty-seven schools. It is now the financial centre of Odisha.

History and administration 

Cuttack Municipal Corporation was formed to improve the infrastructure of the town as per the needs of the local population. Cuttack Municipal Corporation has been categorised into 59 wards and each ward is headed by a councillor, for which elections are held every five years.

Cuttack Municipal Corporation is governed by mayor Subhash Singh and administered by the municipal commissioner .

Functions 
Cuttack Municipal Corporation was created for the following functions:

 Planning for the town including its surroundings which are covered under its Department's Urban Planning Authority.
 Approving construction of new buildings and authorising use of land for various purposes.
 Improving of the town's economic and social status.
 Arranging water supply for commercial, residential and industrial purposes.
 Planning for fire contingencies through fire service departments.
 Creating solid waste management, public health system and sanitary services.
 Developing ecological aspects, such as the development of urban forestry and creating guidelines for environmental protection.
 Working for the development of weaker sections of society including the mentally and physically handicapped, elderly and gender biased people.
 Making efforts to improve slums and end poverty in the town.

Revenue sources 

The following are the income sources for the corporation from the Central and State Government.

Revenue from taxes 
Following is the tax-related revenue for the corporation:

 Property tax
 Profession tax
 Entertainment tax
 Grants from Central and State Government, like the goods and services tax
 Advertisement tax

Revenue from non-tax sources 

Following is the non-tax-related revenue for the corporation:

 Water usage charges
 Fees from documentation services
 Rent received from municipal property
 Funds from municipal bonds

References

External links
 

Cuttack
Local government in Odisha
1876 establishments in India
Municipal corporations in Odisha